Josef Stangl (12 March 1907 – 8 April 1979) was a Roman Catholic bishop of Würzburg, Germany.

Born in Kronach, Bavaria, Stangl became a priest on 16 March 1930, and he was appointed by Pope Pius XII as Bishop of Würzburg on 27 June 1957.

He approved the exorcism on Anneliese Michel in 1975 and 1976, ordering total secrecy, "after careful consideration and good information" by Father Arnold Renz. She died of malnutrition from almost a year of semi-starvation while the rites of exorcism were performed.

Stangl consecrated Father Joseph Ratzinger, later Pope Benedict XVI, as a bishop on 28 May 1977.

On 8 January 1979, Stangl withdrew as a bishop of Würzburg, and died in Schweinfurt in April 1979.

References

External links 
Bishop Stangl at catholic-hierarchy.org

1907 births
1979 deaths
People from Kronach (district)
Roman Catholic bishops of Würzburg
Exorcism in the Catholic Church
Participants in the Second Vatican Council
20th-century German Roman Catholic bishops
Commanders Crosses of the Order of Merit of the Federal Republic of Germany
20th-century German Roman Catholic priests